"Por Arriba, Por Abajo" (English: "Upwards, Downwards") is the fifth single from Ricky Martin's album, Vuelve (1998). It was released on November 3, 1998. The remixes for the European single release were created by Pablo Flores.

Music video
The music video was shot by Pedro Aznar in December 1998 in Barcelona.

Chart performance
The song reached number thirty-three on the Hot Latin Songs in the United States and number thirteen in Spain.

Formats and track listings
Brazilian promotional CD maxi-single
"Por Arriba, Por Abajo (G-VÔ Radio Mix) – 3:46
"Por Arriba, Por Abajo (G-VÔ Edit Mix) – 4:33
"Por Arriba, Por Abajo (G-VÔ Mix) – 6:52
"Por Arriba, Por Abajo (Album Version) – 3:07

European CD maxi-single
"Por Arriba, Por Abajo (Batu) (Club Remix) – 9:27
"Por Arriba, Por Abajo (Remix Radio Edit) – 4:17
"Por Arriba, Por Abajo (Batu) (Acappella Mix) – 6:54

Mexican promotional CD maxi-single
"Por Arriba, Por Abajo (Batu) (Club Remix) – 9:27
"Por Arriba, Por Abajo (Remix Radio Edit) – 4:17
"Por Arriba, Por Abajo (Batu) (Acappella Mix) – 6:54
"Por Arriba, Por Abajo – 3:07

Charts

References

1998 singles
Spanish-language songs
Songs written by Draco Rosa
Songs written by Luis Gómez Escolar
1998 songs
Sony Discos singles
Song recordings produced by K. C. Porter
Columbia Records singles